The Serviciul Special de Poliţie pentru Intervenţie Rapidă (Police Rapid Intervention Service, SSPIR) was created in 1999, as a Romanian Police special operations unit for Bucharest.

SPIR is divided in five units:
Detaşamentul Mobil pentru Siguranţa Publică (Mobile Public Security Detachment, DMSP)
Detaşamentul Special pentru Intervenţii Flagrante (Special Immediate Intervention Detachment, DSIF)
Detaşamentul pentru Intervenţii şi Escorte Speciale (Special Escort and Intervention Detachment, DIES)
Detaşamentul pentru Intervenţii şi Acţiuni Speciale (Special Action and Intervention Detachment, DIAS)
Detaşamentul Special pentru Combaterea Violenţei (Special Counter-riot Detachment, DSCV)

See also
 Romanian Police

References

Romanian Police
Special forces of Romania